Mark Zsifkovits is a production sound mixer. He is a joint winner of a Genie Award for Best Achievement in Overall Sound for his work in Eastern Promises.

Recognition 
 2008 Genie Award for Best Achievement in Overall Sound – Eastern Promises – Nominee (shared with Stuart Wilson, Christian Cooke, Orest Sushko).
 2005 Gemini Award for Best Sound in a Dramatic Program – Lives of the Saints – Won (shared with John Laing, Todd Beckett, Rob Bertola, Keith Elliott, Mark Gingras, Tim O'Connell, Jill Purdy, John J. Thomson)
 2003 Genie Award for Best Achievement in Overall Sound – Between Strangers – Won (shared with Thomas Hidderley, Todd Beckett, Keith Elliott)

References

External links 
 

Canadian Screen Award winners
Best Sound Genie and Canadian Screen Award winners
Year of birth missing (living people)
Place of birth missing (living people)
Living people